The 2008 FC Moscow season was the club's 5th season in existence after taking over the licence of Torpedo-Metallurg in 2004. They finished the season in 9th place, and reached the Round of 16 in the Russian Cup, with the Quarterfinal taking place in the 2009 season.

Squad

On loan

Left club during season

Transfers

In

Loans in

Out

Loans out

Released

Competitions

Premier League

Results by round

Results

League table

Russian Cup

2008–09

UEFA Cup

Squad statistics

Appearances and goals

|-
|colspan="14"|Players away from the club on loan:

|-
|colspan="14"|Players who appeared for Moscow but left during the season:

|}

Goal scorers

Clean sheets

Disciplinary record

References

FC Moscow seasons
Moscow